Unto the Dusk (Malayalam:  അസ്തമയം വരെ  or Asthamayam Vare) is a Malayalam film directed by Sajin Baabu as his first feature project in Malayalam.  The film stars first-timers Prakruthi Dutta Mukheri, Shilpa Kavalam, and Sanal Aman.

Background
Wishing to try a "novel approach" to visual communication, Sajin Baabu wrote the script with no background score and with characters being un-named, and in December 2010, while he was with a team at the Kairali Theatre in Thiruvananthapuram to shoot a documentary of one of the IFFK delegates, he met writer and artist M.P. Sheeja. After he showed her his script for Unto the Dusk, she agreed to produce it with her associate L. Geetha.  In December 2013, the film was reported and being near completion with an expected release date for some time in early 2014.  Most of the film's cast are "first-timers".

Plot
The film opens with a scene of death of a young choir singer in a seminary with evidence pointing towards necrophilia. The police suspects and tortures two seminary students. What follows is a nonlinear, fragmented, cinematic collection of images that travel back and forth in time, in fine detail at times and just a suggestive glance at other times, thus assisting and obfuscating the viewer in this engagement with the film.

Cast

 Sanal Aman
 Prakruthi Dutta Mukherji
 Shilpa Kavalam
 Joseph Mappilacherry
 Zakkir
 Neeraj Gupta
 Sivan Vadakara
 Stephy Johns
 Meenakshi
 Shabna
 Titus
 Shajahan Abhinaya
 N. M. Sunny
 Saji Kaavalam

Awards and nominations
Unto the dusk was first premiered in Mumbai International Film Festival in 2014 in India Gold category followed by Bengaluru International Film festival 2014 where it won Chitrbharathi award for Best Indian Film. The film was one of the movies that was selected for the International Film competition section in International Film Festival of Kerala (IFFK) 2014 winning Rajathachakoram and the Certificate of Merit for Promotion.

The movie also won the director, Sajin Baabu, the Best-Debut Director Award at Kerala Film Critic's Association 2014.

References

External links
 Unto the Dusk at the Internet Movie Database
  as archived 31 October 2014

Indian road movies
2014 films
2010s Malayalam-language films